Algis is a Lithuanian male given name, an abbreviation of Algimantas. Notable people with the name include:

Algis Budrys (1931–2008), Lithuanian-American science fiction author, editor and critic
Algis Ignatavicius (born 1931), Lithuanian-Australian basketball player
Algis Jankauskas (born 1982), Lithuanian footballer
Algis Kizys (born 1960), American bass guitarist
Algis Matulionis (born 1947), actor and screenwriter
Algis Oleknavicius (born 1947), cyclist
Algis Skačkauskas (1955–2009), Lithuanian painter
Algis Uždavinys (1962–2010), Lithuanian philosopher and scholar

Lithuanian masculine given names